The Cardiogenesis Corporation (OtherOTC:CGCP) is a medical device company specializing in products for the treatment of chronic cardiac ischemia.

The company's Ho:YAG laser system and disposable fiber-optic accessories are used to perform an FDA-cleared surgical procedure known as Transmyocardial revascularization(TMR). As a surgical tool, Holmium:YAG is used in a variety of medical specialties including orthopedics, urology, ENT, gynecology, gastroenterology and cardiac surgery. The fiberoptic delivery of the Ho:YAG laser makes available the minimally invasive delivery of the prescribed energy to the surgical site via ports or small incisions.

Founded in 1989, Cardiogenesis is headquartered in Irvine, California and sells its products primarily in the United States with clinical centers in Europe and Asia.  As of 2011, it has approximately 30 direct employees with stated past year revenue over $11,000,000.

The term cardiogenesis is defined as the development of the heart in the embryo. The corporation derives its name from this word and the clinical support that TMR stimulates growth of new blood vessels in heart tissue.

Market
Cardiogenesis products focus on the treatment of refractory angina in patients with diffuse coronary artery disease(CAD).  Patients with chronic angina (chest pain) are generally managed aggressively with medications to help alleviate their symptoms and frequently receive multiple coronary interventions and even bypass surgery over the course of the advancement of their disease. When chest pain continues in spite of treatments, the condition is considered, "refractory angina."

Coronary artery disease remains a leading cause of death for persons over the age of 65 in the United States. It is estimated that in the United States 100,000-200,000 symptomatic patients are diagnosed each year with refractory angina but are not candidates for further intervention or bypass surgery. A contemporary study indicates that as many of 3 out of 10 patients with CAD may have incomplete revascularization.

In addition to the TMR procedure, Cardiogenesis is developing proprietary catheter-based systems for the delivery of biologics, such as stem cells, as an adjunctive therapy for this patient population.

References

External links 
 Cardiogenesis Website
 About TMR
 Investor Information
 Patient Testimonial Videos

Companies established in 1989
Companies based in Irvine, California